USS Lake Champlain (CV/CVA/CVS-39) was one of 24 s completed during or shortly after World War II for the United States Navy. She was the second US Navy ship to bear the name, and was named for the Battle of Lake Champlain in the War of 1812.

Commissioned on 3 June 1945, Lake Champlain did not participate in World War II, but did serve as a transport, bringing troops home from Europe as part of Operation Magic Carpet. Like many of her sister ships, she was decommissioned shortly after the end of the war, but was modernized and recommissioned in the early 1950s, and redesignated as an attack carrier (CVA). She participated in the Korean War but spent the rest of her career in the Atlantic, Caribbean, and Mediterranean. In the late 1950s, she was redesignated as an antisubmarine carrier (CVS).

She was the prime recovery ship for the first manned Project Mercury mission (Freedom 7), the second unmanned Gemini mission (Gemini 2), and for the third manned Gemini (Gemini 5) space mission.

Lake Champlain had a unique modernization history. She was the only Essex-class ship to receive the SCB-27 conversion which was a rebuild of the superstructure, flight deck and other features but without also receiving the SCB-125 conversion which would have given her an angled flight deck and hurricane bow. Therefore, she was the last operational US aircraft carrier with an axial flight deck.

Lake Champlain was decommissioned in 1966 and sold for scrap in 1972.

Construction and commissioning
Lake Champlain was one of the "long-hull" Essex-class ships. She was laid down in Drydock No. 8 at the Norfolk Navy Yard, Portsmouth, Virginia, on 15 March 1943. The hull was launched from drydock on 2 November 1944. Lake Champlain commissioned on 3 June 1945 under the command of Captain Logan Ramsey. The ship was sponsored by Mrs. Warren Austin, wife of Senator Austin of Vermont.

Service history

Operation Magic Carpet
After shakedown and visits to New York and Philadelphia, Lake Champlain was assigned to "Magic Carpet" duty to repatriate US military personnel. She departed Norfolk for England on 14 October, and arrived at Southampton on the 19th where she embarked veterans and returned them to New York.

She set a speed record, averaging 32.048 kn, for crossing the Atlantic on 26 November 1945 when she arrived at Norfolk, Virginia, having completed a run from Gibraltar, a distance of 3360.3 nautical miles, in 4 days, 8 hours, 51 minutes.

Lake Champlain was laid up in the reserve fleet at Norfolk on 17 February 1947.

Korean War
Lake Champlain was needed again for the Korean War. In August 1950, she began her SCB-27A modernization program at Newport News Shipbuilding and Drydock Company. She recommissioned on 19 September 1952.

A shakedown cruise in Cuban and Haitian waters lasted from 25 November to 25 December 1952. The carrier departed Mayport, Florida, for Korea on 26 April 1953 via the Red Sea, Indian Ocean, and South China Sea. Lake Champlain became the largest ship to date to transit the Suez Canal. She moored at Yokosuka, Japan, on 9 June 1953.

As flagship of Carrier Task Force 77 (TF 77), she sailed from Yokosuka on 11 June and arrived off western Korea on 14 June. The carrier's air group immediately launched sorties cratering runways; assaulting enemy troops; attacking trenches, bunkers, gun positions; and giving close air support to hard pressed ground forces. Her planes also escorted B-29 Superfortress heavy bombers on their way to enemy targets. Lake Champlain continued to strike at the enemy until the truce was signed on 27 July. Bidding farewell to the Pacific Ocean on 27 October, she steamed toward home, touching at Colombo, Port Said, Cannes, and Lisbon before arriving Mayport, Florida, on 4 December 1953.

Postwar years

NATO, Middle East and reclassification

In the years that followed, Lake Champlain made several cruises to the Mediterranean, participating with NATO forces. On 25 April 1957, in response to tensions between Jordan's king and parliament (see 1957 alleged Jordanian military coup attempt), she joined elements of her fleet in a high-speed run to the vicinity of Lebanon, where she backed King Hussein.  King Hussein ended Jordan's constitutional democracy, dissolving political parties, dismissing municipal councils, censoring the press, imposing military curfew, and culling the military of dissenting elements. The tensions eased and Lake Champlain returned to Mayport on 27 July. Converted to an antisubmarine carrier and reclassified (CVS-39) on 1 August, Lake Champlain trained off the eastern seaboard to master her new role.

Lake Champlain was near the island of Majorca when the Spanish city of Valencia was devastated by floods on the night of 14 October 1957. The American ambassador to Spain, John Davis Lodge, requested that Lake Champlain provide assistance for rescue operations. The ship's Chickasaw helicopters undertook numerous rescue missions, and the ship's crew fought in the "mud battle" that followed the disaster.

She departed Bayonne, New Jersey, on 8 February 1958 for another Mediterranean cruise returning to Mayport, Florida, on 30 October. After a yard overhaul, she departed for the Mediterranean on 10 June and visited Spain, Denmark, and Scotland, before returning to Mayport on 9 August.

The carrier operated off Florida and in the Caribbean until 15 June 1958, when she sailed on another Mediterranean cruise returning to her newly assigned home port, Quonset Point, Rhode Island, on 4 September.

The carrier operated out of Quonset Point until 29 June 1960, when she made a midshipmen's cruise to Halifax, Nova Scotia, returning on 12 August. Beginning on 7 February, she made a cruise to the Caribbean, returning on 2 March.

Project Mercury
Lake Champlain was selected as the prime recovery ship for America's first manned space flight. She sailed for the recovery area on 1 May, and was on station on 5 May when Commander Alan Shepard was recovered, along with his spacecraft Freedom 7, after splashdown some  down range from Cape Canaveral. Helicopters from the carrier visually tracked the descent of the capsule and were over it two minutes after splashdown. They recovered Shepard and the Freedom 7 capsule, delivering them safely to Lake Champlains flight deck.

During retrieval, the vessel was under the command of then-Captain Ralph Weymouth. There were some complications in retrieval, as the helicopters that were to retrieve Alan Shepard from the craft did not have the explosive squibs required to cut the Mercury craft's radio antenna. The Mercury craft's antenna was designed to help locate the craft if it landed out of visual tracking range. The antenna would have gotten in the way of retrieving Shepard from the craft if it had deployed; fortunately, it had a malfunction and was unable to deploy.

Caribbean and Cuban blockade
For the next year, the ship operated along the Atlantic coast and in the Caribbean. In June 1962, she and her escorts embarked First and Third Class Regular NROTC Midshipmen for a summer training cruise from NAS Quonset Point to offshore training areas, Canadian Forces Base Halifax, Naval Station Guantanamo Bay, and Kingston, Jamaica, where she represented the US at the island's celebration of its independence on 3 August. The midshipmen acted as tour guides for visitors aboard and provided an honor guard ashore for then-VP Lyndon Johnson's speech in a local park.

On 24 October, Lake Champlain joined in a classic exercise of sea power – the quarantine of Cuba, where the Soviet Union was constructing bases for offensive missiles. To block this grave threat, U.S. warships deployed throughout the western Atlantic, choking off the flow of military supplies to Cuba and enforcing American demands for the withdrawal of the Russian offensive missiles.

After the American demands were substantially complied with, Lake Champlain sailed for home on 23 November via St. Thomas, Virgin Islands, and arrived Quonset Point on 4 December 1962. For the next few months the carrier was in New England waters for operations and overhaul. In September 1963, while she was on a cruise to Guantanamo Bay, her training schedule was interrupted when she was ordered to Haiti to relieve distress caused by Hurricane Flora. Her helicopters located homeless victims and flew them food and medical supplies.

On 6 May 1964, an collision occurred between Lake Champlain and USS Decatur while underway in the Atlantic Ocean. No one was injured during the accident and Decatur sailed back to Norfolk under her own power with significant damage to her mast, superstructure and stack.

North Atlantic and Project Gemini
Lake Champlain returned to Quonset Point on 9 November for operations in New England waters. She visited Bermuda briefly in spring of 1964 and steamed to Spain in the fall for landings near Huelva. She sailed on 6 November from Barcelona for the United States, touched at Gibraltar and arrived at Quonset Point on 25 November. The first half of 1965 found Lake Champlain performing training duties and conducting exercises up and down the East Coast, and on 19 January 1965, was the recovery ship for the unmanned Gemini 2 mission. For FY 1966, the Navy proposed a modernization program for Lake Champlain. Secretary of Defense Robert McNamara refused to authorize the proposal, citing the limited effectiveness of anti-submarine carriers.

Lake Champlain completed her last major duty on 29 August 1965 when she served as the primary recovery ship for Gemini 5. Shortly afterward, she sailed to Philadelphia Navy Yard, where she commenced inactivation. She was decommissioned on 2 May 1966 and was laid up in the Reserve Fleet.

The 24-year-old Lake Champlain was stricken from the Navy List on 1 December 1969, and sold by the Defense Reutilization and Marketing Service (DRMS) for scrapping on 28 April 1972.

Awards 

 American Campaign Medal 
 European-African-Middle Eastern Campaign Medal
 World War II Victory Medal
 Navy Occupation Service Medal (Europe clasp)
 National Defense Service Medal (2)
 Korean Service Medal (1 battle star)
 Armed Forces Expeditionary Medal
 United Nations Korean Medal
 Republic of Korea War Service Medal (retroactive)

Gallery

See also
 List of aircraft carriers
 List of aircraft carriers of the United States Navy

References

External links

Naval Historical Center page on Lake Champlain

1944 ships
Cold War aircraft carriers of the United States
Korean War aircraft carriers of the United States
Ships built in Portsmouth, Virginia
Ticonderoga-class aircraft carriers
World War II aircraft carriers of the United States
Space capsule recovery ships